Rubia fruticosa is a species of flowering plant in the family Rubiaceae, native to the Canary Islands, Madeira and the Savage Islands.

References

fruticosa
Flora of the Canary Islands
Flora of Madeira
Flora of the Savage Islands
Plants described in 1789